This article is about the particular significance of the year 1839 to Wales and its people.

Incumbents
Lord Lieutenant of Anglesey – Henry Paget, 1st Marquess of Anglesey 
Lord Lieutenant of Brecknockshire – Penry Williams
Lord Lieutenant of Caernarvonshire – Peter Drummond-Burrell, 22nd Baron Willoughby de Eresby 
Lord Lieutenant of Cardiganshire – William Edward Powell
Lord Lieutenant of Carmarthenshire – George Rice, 3rd Baron Dynevor 
Lord Lieutenant of Denbighshire – Sir Watkin Williams-Wynn, 5th Baronet    
Lord Lieutenant of Flintshire – Robert Grosvenor, 1st Marquess of Westminster 
Lord Lieutenant of Glamorgan – John Crichton-Stuart, 2nd Marquess of Bute 
Lord Lieutenant of Merionethshire – Sir Watkin Williams-Wynn, 5th Baronet
Lord Lieutenant of Monmouthshire – Capel Hanbury Leigh
Lord Lieutenant of Montgomeryshire – Edward Herbert, 2nd Earl of Powis
Lord Lieutenant of Pembrokeshire – Sir John Owen, 1st Baronet
Lord Lieutenant of Radnorshire – George Rodney, 3rd Baron Rodney

Bishop of Bangor – Christopher Bethell 
Bishop of Llandaff – Edward Copleston 
Bishop of St Asaph – William Carey 
Bishop of St Davids – John Jenkinson

Events
March – John Frost, former mayor of Newport, is deprived of his position as a magistrate because of his Chartist sympathies.
30 April – Chartists riot in Llanidloes and seize control of the town for five days.
7 May – Henry Vincent is arrested after addressing a Chartist meeting and taken to prison at Monmouth.
13 May – Beginning of the Rebecca Riots.
25 July – William Ewart Gladstone marries Catherine Glynne of Hawarden.
28 August – Mary Anne Lewis, widow of Cardiff MP Wyndham Lewis, marries Benjamin Disraeli.
5 October – Opening of West Bute Dock.
4 November – Newport Rising: between 5,000 and 10,000 Chartist sympathisers led by John Frost, many of them coal miners, march on the Westgate Hotel in Newport, Monmouthshire, to liberate Chartist prisoners; around 22 are killed when troops, directed by Thomas Phillips, the mayor, fire on the crowd. This is the last large-scale armed civil rebellion against authority in mainland Britain and sees the most deaths.
23 November – Zephaniah Williams, one of the leaders of the Chartist march on Newport, is arrested on board ship at Cardiff.
date unknown – Sir Thomas Frankland Lewis resigns as chairman of the Poor Law Commission, to be replaced by his son, George Cornewall Lewis.

Arts and literature

New books
William Bingley – Excursions in North Wales
Maria James – Wales and other Poems
William Williams (Caledfryn) – Drych Barddonol

Music
John Roberts (Ieuan Gwyllt) – Hafilah (hymn tune)

Births
9 January – Sarah Jane Rees (Cranogwen), writer (d. 1916)
13 February (in England) – Robert Bird, politician (d. 1909)
7 March (in Germany) – Ludwig Mond, German-born industrialist (d. 1909)
31 March – Thomas Henry Thomas (Arlunydd Penygarn) later known as T. H. Thomas, artist (d. 1915)
24 September (in England) – John Neale Dalton, royal chaplain and tutor (d. 1931)

Deaths
27 January – Sir Charles Paget, MP for Caernarfon, 60 (yellow fever)
11 May – "Doctor" John Harries, Cwrt-y-cadno, physician, 54
16 May – Edward Clive, 1st Earl of Powis, 84
20 May – Rice Rees, historian, 35
29 December – Hopkin Bevan, minister and author, 74

References

Wales